Zatyshne may refer to several places in Ukraine:

Crimea
 Zatyshne, Crimea, village in Lenine Raion

Dnipropetrovsk Oblast
 Zatyshne, Kamianske Raion, Dnipropetrovsk Oblast, village in Kamianske Raion
 Zatyshne, Novomoskovsk Raion, Dnipropetrovsk Oblast, village in Novomoskovsk Raion
 Zatyshne, Pavlohrad Raion, Dnipropetrovsk Oblast, village in Pavlohrad Raion

Donetsk Oblast
 Zatyshne, Donetsk Oblast, village in Volnovakha Raion

Kharkiv Oblast
 Zatyshne, Kharkiv Raion, Kharkiv Oblast, village in Kharkiv Raion
 Zatyshne, Kupiansk Raion, Kharkiv Oblast, village in Kupiansk Raion

Kyiv Oblast
 Zatyshne, Kyiv Oblast, village in Boryspil Raion

Luhansk Oblast
 Zatyshne, Luhansk Oblast, village in Sievierodonetsk Raion

Ternopil Oblast
 Zatyshne, Ternopil Oblast, village in Chortkiv Raion

Vinnytsia Oblast
 Zatyshne, Vinnytsia Oblast, village in Tulchyn Raion

Zakarpattia Oblast
 Zatyshne, Zakarpattia Oblast, village in Berehove Raion